Capital punishment in the Cook Islands, a state in free association with New Zealand, was officially part of the legal system until 2007, although the punishment had never actually been put into practice.

The death penalty was legal under New Zealand colonial rule. The Cook Islands Act 1915, which governed both the Cook Islands and Niue, provided for the mandatory death penalty for both treason and murder. The method of execution was by hanging. When New Zealand temporarily abolished the death penalty for murder from 1941 to 1949, it did not extend abolition to the Cook Islands. When the government of Niue was split from the Cook Islands in 1957, the use of the death penalty was reaffirmed, and provision was made for executions to be carried out in New Zealand.

In October 1956 Rima Kurariki was convicted of murder and sentenced to death. The sentenced was commuted to life imprisonment in 1957.

New Zealand abolished the death penalty for murder in 1961. Abolition was extended to the Cook Islands in 1962. Post-independence, the Cook Islands government reaffirmed the death penalty for treason in section 76 of the Crimes Act 1969. This was defined as participation in a war against the Cook Islands or New Zealand, an attempt to overthrow the Cook Islands government, or an attempt to harm the Queen of New Zealand. The laws regarding capital punishment were based on New Zealand law at the time. Further provisions for the death penalty were enacted in the Criminal Procedure Act 1980-1981.

The Cook Islands announced the removal of its provisions for capital punishment in 2007, without ever having put them into use.

References

2007 disestablishments in the Cook Islands
Cook Islands
Cook Islands law
Death in the Cook Islands
Society of the Cook Islands